Silvertone Records is a current British record label, owned by Sony Music UK. Originally an independent record label, owned by Clive Calder's Jive Records, which was acquired in time by Bertelsmann Music Group, the original BMG company which would go on to merge with Sony Music, bring the Jive catalogue to Sony as the Zomba Music Group. In 2017, Sony Music UK relaunched the brand as a label for left-field acts, with indie, alt-folk, blues and jazz acts represented in its signings.

The first and most famous signing to the label was the Stone Roses in the late 1980s, with whom they later had a lengthy legal battle. According to Jeff Fenster, former Senior VP of A&R, Jive Records/Silvertone Records, Silvertone started as a roots rock-oriented label that developed over time into an alternative music label. After Zomba acquired various Christian labels, acts like Jars of Clay were moved to the Silvertone label, and subsequently released two platinum-selling records as Silvertone artists.

Silvertone Artists 

Acts signed to Silvertone since 2017 include Hugh Cornwell, Hailey Tuck, Joanne Shaw Taylor and Wildwood Kin. In 2021, Bobby Gillespie of Primal Scream and Jehnny Beth of Savages teamed up for an album called Utopian Ashes which was released by Sony Legacy through the Silvertone label.

Other acts signed to the label during its history include Chris Duarte, Whiteout, John Mayall, Buddy Guy, the Men They Couldn't Hang, Bowling for Soup, Alan Wren, Matt Odmark, John Squire, Stephen Mason (solo), Mick Weaver, Gary Mounfield, Metal Molly, Del Shannon and Loudon Wainwright III.

See also
 List of record labels
 Silvertone Records (disambiguation)

References

British record labels
Indie rock record labels
Zomba Group of Companies subsidiaries